Escadron de Transport 1/61 Touraine is a French Air and Space Force squadron located at Orléans – Bricy Air Base, Loiret, France which operates the Airbus A400M Atlas.

The second A400M for the squadron was christened "Ville de Toulouse" on January 22, 2014 at Toulouse–Blagnac Airport.

See also

 List of French Air and Space Force aircraft squadrons

References

French Air and Space Force squadrons